Haddingtonshire  was a Scottish county constituency represented in the House of Commons of Great Britain and the House of Commons of the United Kingdom from 1708 to 1918.

Creation
The British parliamentary constituency was created in 1708 following the Acts of Union, 1707 and replaced the former Parliament of Scotland shire constituency of  Haddingtonshire.

Boundaries
The constituency   encompassed the county of Haddingtonshire, with the exception, until 1885, of three towns (Haddington, Dunbar and North Berwick) which formed part of the separate constituency of Haddington Burghs.

History
The constituency elected one Member of Parliament (MP) by the first past the post system until the seat was abolished for the 1918 general election.

 In 1918, it was merged with the neighbouring Berwickshire constituency to form a new Berwick and Haddington constituency.

Members of Parliament

Elections

Elections in the 1830s

Broun-Ramsay succeeded to the peerage, becoming 10th Earl of Dalhousie and causing a by-election.

Elections in the 1840s

Elections in the 1850s

Charteris was appointed a Lord Commissioner of the Treasury, requiring a by-election.

Elections in the 1860s

Elections in the 1870s

Elections in the 1880s

Charteris is elevated to the peerage, becoming Earl of Wemyss and March, causing a by-election.

Elections in the 1890s

Elections in the 1900s

Elections in the 1910s

General Election 1914–15:

Another General Election was required to take place before the end of 1915. The political parties had been making preparations for an election to take place and by the July 1914, the following candidates had been selected; 
Liberal: John Hope
Unionist: Hugh Macmillan

References

Historic parliamentary constituencies in Scotland (Westminster)
Constituencies of the Parliament of the United Kingdom established in 1708
Constituencies of the Parliament of the United Kingdom disestablished in 1918